Mitchellania is a genus of springtails in the family Hypogastruridae. There are about 15 described species in Mitchellania.

Species
These 15 species belong to the genus Mitchellania:

 Mitchellania alani (Babenko in Babenko, Chernova, Potapov & Stebaeva, 1994) i c g
 Mitchellania californica (Bacon, 1914) i c g
 Mitchellania franzi (Butschek & Gisin, 1949) i c g
 Mitchellania gibbomucronata Hammer, 1953 i c g
 Mitchellania hermosa Wray, 1953 i c g
 Mitchellania hiawatha (Yosii, 1962) i c g
 Mitchellania horrida (Yosii, 1960) i c g
 Mitchellania hystrix (Handschin, 1924) i c g
 Mitchellania krafti (Scott, 1962) i c g
 Mitchellania loricata (Yosii, 1960) i c g
 Mitchellania pilosa (Yosii, 1956) i c g
 Mitchellania subhorrida (Babenko in Babenko, Chernova, Potapov & Stebaeva, 1994) i c g
 Mitchellania virga (Christiansen & Bellinger, 1980) i c g
 Mitchellania vulgaris (Yosii, 1960) i c g
 Mitchellania wallmoi Fjellberg, 1985 i c g

Data sources: i = ITIS, c = Catalogue of Life, g = GBIF, b = Bugguide.net

References

Further reading

 
 
 

Collembola
Springtail genera